The Syrian Social Nationalist Party (SSNP) is a Syrian nationalist party operating in Syria, Lebanon, Jordan, and Palestine. It advocates the establishment of a Greater Syrian nation state spanning the Fertile Crescent, including present-day Syria, Lebanon, Iraq, Kuwait, Jordan, Palestine, Cyprus, Sinai, Hatay Province, and Cilicia, based on geographical boundaries and the common history people within the boundaries share. It has also been active in the Syrian and Lebanese diaspora, for example in South America with over 100,000 members as of 2016, it is the second-largest legal political group in Syria after the ruling Arab Socialist Ba'ath Party.

Founded in Beirut in 1932 by the Greek Orthodox Lebanese intellectual Antoun Saadeh as an anticolonial and national liberation organization hostile to French colonialism, the party played a significant role in Lebanese politics and was involved in attempted coups d'état in 1949 and 1961, following which it was thoroughly repressed. It was active in resistance against the 1982 Israeli invasion of Lebanon and the subsequent occupation of southern Lebanon until 2000, while continuously supporting the Syrian presence in Lebanon out of belief in Syrian irredentism.

In Syria, the SSNP had become a major syncretic political force in the early 1950s, but was thoroughly repressed in 1955–56. It remained organized, and by the late 1990s had allied itself with the Palestine Liberation Organisation and the Lebanese Communist Party, despite the ideological differences between them. The SSNP was legalized in Syria in 2005, and joined the Ba'ath Party-led National Progressive Front. From 2012 to 6 May 2014, the party was part of the Popular Front for Change and Liberation. During the course of the Syrian Civil War, the party has become more prominent in Syria, where almost 12,000 fighters of the party's armed branch, the Eagles of the Whirlwind, have fought alongside the Syrian Armed Forces against the Syrian opposition and the Islamic State.

Background

Early Syrian nationalists
In the mid-nineteenth century Butrus al-Bustani was one of the first to assert the existence of a natural Syrian nation that should be accommodated in a reformed Ottoman Empire. He belonged to the Nahda, thinkers influenced by the Arabic Literary Renaissance and the French Revolution and who wished to shape the Tanzimat reforms, which were an attempt to introduce a constitutional monarchy with religious freedom to reverse the Ottoman state's creeping economic marginalisation and which would lead to the Young Turks and the Second Constitutional Era.

An influential follower of al-Bustani was the Belgian Jesuit historian, Henri Lammens, ordained as a priest in Beirut in 1893, who claimed that Greater Syria had since ancient times encompassed all the land between the Arab peninsula, Egypt, the Levantine corridor and the Taurus Mountains, including all the peoples within the Fertile Crescent.

This was also accompanied with the rise of a profoundly idealistic patriotism, largely resembling European romantic nationalism, idealizing the coming of a National Revival to the Levant, that would shake off the Ottoman past and propel back what many started to see again as the cradle of civilization into the modern world's front stage. In that aspect, the works of Kahlil Gibran (the English name of Jubran Khalil Jubran) who began expressing his belief in Syrian nationalism and patriotism are central. As Gibran said, "I believe in you, and I believe in your destiny. I believe that you are contributors to this new civilization.... I believe that it is in you to be good citizens. And what is it to be a good citizen?... It is to stand before the towers of New York and Washington, Chicago and San Francisco saying in your hearts, "I am the descendent of a people the built Damascus and Byblos, and Tyre and Sidon and Antioch, and I am here to build with you, and with a will."

Colonialism, Zionism, and sectarianism

The late 1920s and the early 1930s were also a period of cultural and political effervescence that greatly contributed to the emergence of Syrian nationalism as a distinct ideology. In 1920, the French army toppled the first Arab Kingdom of Syria and the Hashemite King Faisal, who had been proclaimed "King of all-Syria" by the Syrian National Congress at the Battle of Maysalun. The British and the French dissected the region into spheres of influence in what later became known as the Sykes-Picot Agreement, setting up colonial administrations throughout the Levant. 

The Great Syrian Revolt was brutally repressed in 1925 while a small clique of traditional landowners and notables coalesced around the newly founded administration of the French Mandate for Syria and the Lebanon. Greater Lebanon was established on the ruins of the Mutasarrifiyya of Mount Lebanon with arbitrarily drawn borders and with a state structure largely dominated by the Christian Maronites, a community whose elite were historically well-disposed to the French, and who would ensure the French colonial empire a strong foothold in the Arab world. Jewish immigration to Palestine was increasing at an alarming speed, bringing to the shores of Palestine Zionist migrants who had little affinity to (Revisionist Zionism) or similarities with (Marxist and Labor Zionism) the local Palestinian Arabs. Class tensions sharpened as some Palestinian landowners sold their lands to the Jewish National Fund, with little regard to national aspirations and plight of the peasantry. As the Balfour Declaration became public, fears in the Levant of the parceling out of the region along colonial borders implied in the minds of many the need for concerted action throughout the Levant that would transcend traditional sectarian divides. Similarly, communism, perceived by many as an alien ideology that did not resonate much with the socioeconomic conditions of the early 20th century Levant, was looked upon with suspicion, particularly since many Zionist migrants settling in Palestine were coming from the Soviet Union.

Many Syrian and Lebanese youth saw these events as omens of an ill future in which the Levant, which had until then been a single economic and social entity within the Ottoman Empire referred to as Bilad al-Sham, would be dismembered along religious, ethnic, and class lines. As the traditional elite stirred away from the people and slowly sought the good offices of the French High Commissioner, and given the repression with which the French Mandate was applied, secret societies flourished in the late 1920s. Similarly, many begin to see the devastating effect that sectarianism was bringing upon the people of the region, be it pro-Christian Separatism in Lebanon or the radicalism of Islamist elements in Syria, which pitted each faction against the other and benefited no other than the colonial administration, and began to condemn the mixing of religion with politics. The path was hence laid down for the emergence of a political ideology that would simultaneously fight against the dismemberment of the region, Zionism, and colonialism, through anti-colonialism, liberation war, and national revival, while keeping communism in check. It also represented a clear departure from the Arab nationalist current that advocated the unification of the entirety of the Arab World, and which had implicit Islamic nationalist undertones. This ideology was to be that of a Romanticized Secular Greater Syria based upon the natural geographical boundaries that defined the region loosely dubbed as the Fertile Crescent, an ideology that Antun Saadeh would come to assert with the foundation of the Syrian Social Nationalist Party, where it found its full expression.

Foundation and early years

The SSNP was founded by Antun Saadeh, a Lebanese journalist and lecturer from a Greek Orthodox family who had lived in South America from 1919 to 1930 who in November 1932 secretly established the first nucleus of the Syrian Social Nationalist Party, which operated underground for the first three years of its existence, and in 1933 started publishing the monthly journal Al-Majalla which was distributed in the American University of Beirut and developed the party's ideology. In 1936 the party's open hostility to colonialism led to the French authorities banning the party and the imprisoning Saadeh for six months for creating a clandestine party, although an accusation of having been in contact with the German and Italian fascist movements was dropped after the Germans denied any relationship. During his time in prison Saadeh wrote The Genesis of Nations to lay out the SSNP's ideology. At that time, the Party joined ranks with other nationalist and patriotic forces including the National Bloc, whereas it began militating, in secret, for the overthrow of the Mandate. Nonetheless, the alliance between the SSNP and the National Bloc did not last long: The National Bloc refrained from engaging in actual militant activities against the French, deciding instead to cooperate with the High Commissioner. Many SSNP members also felt that the NB refused to cooperate with them due to the fact that their founder was Christian.

Saadeh emigrated again to Brazil in 1938 and afterwards to Argentina, only to return to Lebanon in 1947 following the country's independence from the French in 1943. On his way to Argentina, he visited Italy and Berlin, which increased the suspicions of the French that the SSNP might have been entertaining relations with the Axis. Coming back shortly to Lebanon in 1939, he was questioned by the French authorities who accused him of plotting with the Germans. The charge was dropped when no evidence of collaboration had been found and after that Saadeh declared that even the French rule to which he was vehemently opposed would be better than German or Italian rule. Having afterwards left for Argentina, Saadeh found out that the Argentinian branch of the SSNP newspaper had been voicing its outright support for Nazi Germany and to the Axis powers, which led Saadeh to issue a lengthy letter to the editor-in-chef, restating that the SSNP is not a National Socialist party and that no stance should be taken vis-à-vis the Allies or the Axis. By that time, the SSNP had grown exponentially and had clashed on many occasions with its primary ideological rival, the Kataeb Party, a Spanish Fascist-Inspired party that had been founded by Pierre Gemayel, a pharmacist and athlete after his return from the 1936 Berlin Olympics. Being vehemently anti-communist in its early days, a position that would later change, it had also clashed with the Syrian-Lebanese Communist Party, the latter accusing the SSNP of Nazi sympathies.

While the Kataeb was committed to the notion of Lebanon as a nation state defined as an entity presiding over the borders outlined first by the Sykes–Picot agreement in 1916, and afterwards by the French administrative division of its mandate into six states including the state of Greater Lebanon, and had espoused a strong bond between the nation and the church as well as outright social ultraconservatism, the SSNP rejected these national claim on the basis that the borders outlining the newly created states were fictitious, resulting from colonialism, and do not reflect any historical and social realities. The party claimed that Greater Syria as defined by Saadeh represents the national ideal encompassing the historical people of Mesopotamia and the Fertile Crescent, bound together by a clearly defined geography and a common historical, social and cultural development path away from all sectarianism.

The Party took a radical stance against the traditional notable class in Syria and Lebanon, including the large landowners and feudal lords, and called for the emancipation of the working class and the peasantry away from religion and sectarianism, into a socialist-inspired production-based economy. The SSNP also called for the reclamation of Alexandretta which had been arbitrarily given to Turkey by France. With the start of the Arab–Israeli conflict in 1948, Saadeh radicalized the party's Anti-Zionist stance by declaring that "Our struggle with the enemy is not a struggle for borders but for existence", and called on Party members to fight in the Arab Liberation Army, although many regular Lebanese and Syrian army officers were already Party members.

When the Lebanese Communist Party, which had fought against Saadeh's return in 1947 and which had been fighting for the title of head of the country's Anti-Zionist movement, declared its acceptance of the Partition Plan, infuriated and increasingly zealous SSNP members burned down a Communist headquarters. As communists defected away after the Communist Party's sudden pivot upon orders from the Soviet Union, the SSNP's ranks swelled.

When the Arabs lost the war in 1948, Saadeh propelled the Party into a fully confrontational stance: He deemed Arabism as a purely rhetorical gimmick, condemned the incompetence and hypocrisy of the Arab leaders, and asserted that the creation of the State of Israel and the expulsion of the Palestinians was the direct result of this incompetence.

On 4 July 1949, a year after the declaration of the establishment of the state of Israel and the 1948 Palestinian exodus (the Nakba), and a response to a series of aggressions perpetrated by the Kataeb-backed Lebanese government, the SSNP attempted its first revolution. Following a violent crackdown by government forces, Saadeh traveled to Damascus to meet with Husni al-Za'im in an attempt to obtain his support. A decision was taken by King Farouk, Riad el Solh and Husni al-Za'im to eliminate Antoun Saadeh, under the patronage of British Intelligence and the Mossad. As a result, Al-Za'im handed Saadeh over to Lebanese authorities, who had him executed on 8 July 1949. It was the shortest and most secretive trial given to a political offender.

SSNP in Lebanon

From confrontation to accommodation 
After Saadeh was executed and its high-ranking leaders were arrested, the party remained underground until 1958 when it sided with the pro-Western president Camille Chamoun against the Arab nationalist rebels. This occurred right after the Party was accused of having plotted the assassination of Adnan al-Malki, a left-leaning Baath Party army officer in Syria, and after Party members had fled to Beirut. The Party at that time still viewed the Soviet Union with contempt, and opposed the Arab Nationalist current of Nasser, while retaining its commitment to Syrian Nationalism. Indeed, the idea of having Greater Syria subsumed under the creed of Arab Nationalism founded on the Arabic language, Arab and Islamic culture was abhorred by the SSNP, which retained its profound belief in Syrian social and anthropological historicism, namely the process of national and social association that characterizes the Fertile Crescent and that differentiates it from the Arabian Peninsula or North Africa.

1961 coup d'etat 

On the last day of 1961, two SSNP members, company commanders in the Lebanese army, led an unsuccessful attempted lightning coup against Fouad Chehab, supported by some 200 civilian SSNP members. In the scholarly literature, the coup has been explained as stemming from the party's ideological preference for violence ("bullets over ballots"), its frustration at exclusion from the Lebanese state, and both political and military criticism of the rule of Fouad Chehab.

Advisors of Chehab who allegedly witnessed armed SSNP partisans gathering around the central areas of Beirut rushed to the presidential palace to inform Chehab of the insurrection. This resulted in a renewed proscription and the imprisonment and/or execution of many SSNP leaders. Most of the party's known activists remained in prison or exile until a general amnesty in 1969. In 1969, the party re-aligned towards Arab nationalism.

Lebanese Civil War 

With the outbreak of the Lebanese Civil War in 1975, the SSNP formed a military squad that allied with the Lebanese National Movement (LNM), against the Phalangists and their allies of the Lebanese Front. The SSNP saw the Lebanese Civil War as the inevitable result of the divisions of the Syrian nation into small states and away from a liberation war against Israel.  In the mid-1970s, there were tensions within the party between "a reformist branch close to the Palestinian factions and another more inclined toward Damascus"; it reunified in 1978.

After the defeat of anti-Israeli forces in the 1982 Lebanon War, the SSNP joined a number of the organizations who regrouped to resist the Israeli occupation, including the killing of two Israeli soldiers in a Wimpy Cafe in west Beirut by party member Khalid Alwan. The U.S. Federal Bureau of Investigation blames the SSNP for the assassination, in 1982, of Bachir Gemayel, Lebanon's newly elected president supported by the Israelis besieging Beirut. An SSNP member, Habib Shartouni, was arrested for the assassination and eventually convicted for it in 2017.

In 1983 the party joined the Lebanese National Salvation Front. In 1985, a member of the party, Sana'a Mehaidli, detonated  a car bomb next to an Israeli military convoy at Jezzin, South Lebanon. She killed two Israeli soldiers and become one of the first known female suicide bombers.

After the Civil War

The SSNP in Lebanon was broadly supportive of the Syrian occupation of Lebanon and was allied to pro-Syrian parties (including the March 8 Alliance) in the aftermath of the occupation.

The SSNP participated in a number of general elections in Lebanon, winning six seats in 1992, although seeing a decline in subsequent elections winning two seats in both 2005 and 2009.  The SSNP were involved in the 2008 conflict in Lebanon, with gunmen attacking an SSNP office.

Assaad Hardan was party leader for two terms. Hardan was succeeded by Rabih Banat in 2020, but with a growing split in the party between Hardan's followers, who are closer to the Syrian government and the March 8 Alliance, and Banat's followers, who are closer to the administration of Saad Hariri. As of the 2022 Lebanese elections, the party did not win any seat and currently has no representation in the Lebanese Parliament.

SSNP in Syria
In Syria, the SSNP grew to a position of considerable influence in the years following the country's independence in 1946, and was a major political force immediately after the restoration of democracy in 1954. It was a fierce rival of the Syrian Communist Party and of the radical pan-Arab Arab Socialist Ba'ath Party, the other main ideological parties of the period. In April 1955 Colonel Adnan al-Malki, a Ba'athist officer who was a very popular figure in the Syrian army, was assassinated by a party member. This provided the Communists and Ba'athists with the opportunity to eliminate their main ideological rival, and under pressure from them and their allies in the security forces the SSNP was practically wiped out as a political force in Syria.

The SSNP's stance during the Lebanese civil war and in Lebanese politics—where it has become a close ally of Hezbollah—was consistent with that of Syria, and that facilitated a rapprochement between the party and the Syrian government. During Hafez al-Assad's presidency, the party was increasingly tolerated. After the succession of his son Bashar in 2000, this process continued. In 2001, although still officially banned, the party was permitted to attend meetings of the Ba'ath-led National Progressive Front coalition of legal parties as an observer. In Spring 2005 the party was legalised in Syria, in what has been described as "an attempt to allow a limited form of political activity".

Over time, the SSNP and the Syrian Baathist regime experienced a dramatic turnabout in their historical relationship, from enemies to allies. The process started as the party reckoned that Hafez al-Assad regional goals such as consolidating Syria's control over Lebanon and the PLO were consistent with the SSNP's goal of establishing Greater Syria, while the SSNP reciprocated acting as a Syrian proxy in Lebanon. The alliance has strengthened on the face of the Syrian Civil War.

In the 22 April 2007 election for the People's Council of Syria, the party gained 3 out of 250 in the parliament. In 2015, journalist Terry Glavin wrote that "But for a brief and friendly interregnum during the Baathist regime’s phoney national elections of 2012, the SSNP has been a member of Assad’s ruling coalition since 2005." Its Syrian leader is Ali Haidar, who has been one of the two non-Baath party minister's in the Damascus government since 2012, as Minister of State for National Reconciliation Affairs.

Notable SSNP politicians in Syria include Diala Barakat, Issam Al Mahayri, Joseph Sweid, Bushra Massouh, and Issam Bagdi.

Role in the Syrian Civil War

The Syrian revolution and civil war "was an opportunity for the SSNP to take on a new dimension", regaining its strength (particularly among Christian and Shi'ite minority groups) and taking on a new purpose. During the civil uprising phase of the Syrian Civil War the SSNP participated in counter demonstrations in support of the government. Once the war broke out, the Syrian government reciprocated providing weaponry and training. In the meantime, SSNP officials had become a target for rebel militants and were kidnapped and assassinated. Bashar al-Yazigi, head of the political SSNP bureau in Syria stated that the "opposition is seeking to create sharp sectarian rifts and fragment Syrian society" with the party regarding both the ongoing Syrian Civil War and the Iraq War as attempts to partition those countries—and, eventually Lebanon—along ethno-sectarian lines.

As of 2016, estimates of the number of SSNP fighters in Syria range from 6,000 to 8,000. Lebanese fighters are included in their ranks, even though the party claims that "their proportion within the group's total fighting force has decreased steadily, as more Syrians sign up".
By February 2014, SSNP fighters were primarily deployed in the governorates of Homs and Damascus and were said to be the most formidable military force other than the Syrian Army in Suweida. SSNP fighters have participated in the battles of Sadad, Ma'loula or al-Qaryatayn, among others. In 2016, party officials say its membership has increased "by the thousands" since the start of the war as a result of its alleged "reputation as an effective fighting force in Syria".

The party is taking on a larger role in Syria's official political system: it fielded 30 candidates for the 2016 parliamentary election, winning 7 seats.

SSNP in Jordan
In 1966 King Hussein had his security services sent into action to eradicate the SSNP from Jordan. The party had been active among the Palestinian population.

In 2013 followers of the party established the "Movement of Syrian Social Nationalists in Jordan".

Ideology
Scholars and analysts have debated how the SSNP's ideology should be described. Many Western scholars have superimposed its ideological and organizational resemblances to European fascism, and of its external symbols to those of German Nazism, although these criticisms are not accepted by the party itself. Recent accounts by Western journalists also describe it as fascist. Terry Glavin writes that it "sports its very own stylized swastika [and] sings an anthem to the tune of Deutschland, Deutschland Uber Alles", while Bellingcat calls its a "rabidly anti-Semitic, fascist organization [with] international ties to the far-right." Other sources are less definitive. For example, L'Orient-Le Jour write that Saadeh's "national vision was based on belonging to one’s geographical milieu, rather than one’s race. His supporters insist that their leader chose the party’s emblem long before he learned of Nazism."

Saadeh was aware of accusations of fascism, and he responded to them during his speech of 1 June 1935:

According to historian Stanley G. Payne, interwar Arab nationalism was influenced by European fascism, with the creation of at least seven Arab nationalist shirt movements similar to the brown shirt movement by 1939, with the most influenced ones being the SSNP, the Iraqi Futawa youth movement and the Young Egypt movement. These three movements would share characteristics like being territorially expansionist, with the SSNP wanting the complete control of Syria, belief in the superiority of their own people (with Saadeh theorizing a "distinct and naturally superior" Syrian race), being "nonrationalist, anti-intellectual, and highly emotional" and "[emphasizing] military virtues and power [and stressing] self-sacrifice". Also according to Payne, all these movements received strong influence from European fascism and praised the Italian and German fascism but "[they never became] fully developed fascist movements, and none reproduced the full characteristics of European fascism"; the influence in Arab nationalism remained long after 1945. Also, Saadeh's superior race was not a pure one, but a fusion of all races in Syrian history. The SSNP would be "[an] elite group, with little structure for mobilization".

Nationalism

Greater Syria, natural Syria 
While in jail from early February to early May 1936, Saadeh completed The Genesis of Nations which he had started writing three months before the French authorities in Lebanon discovered the secret organization and arrested its leader and his assistants. In his book, Saadeh formulated his belief in the existence of a Syrian nation in a homeland defined as embracing all historic Syria extended to the Suez Canal in the south, and that includes modern Syria, Palestine, Israel, Lebanon, Jordan, Iraq, and Kuwait. The boundaries of the historic environment in which the Syrian nation evolved went much beyond the scope usually ascribed to Syria, extending from the Taurus range in the north-east and the Zagros mountains in the north-west to the Suez Canal and the Red Sea in the south and includes the Sinai peninsula and the Gulf of Aqaba, and from the Mediterranean Sea in the west, including the island of Cyprus, to the arch of the Arabian desert and the Persian Gulf in the east. According to Saadeh, this region is also called the Syrian Fertile Crescent, the island Cyprus being its star.

Greater Syria corresponds to the Mesopotamian basin of Bilad al-Sham before it was arbitrarily dissected by the colonial powers. According to Saadeh, geographical factors play an important role in setting the parameters for the process of association and thus for the establishment of a nation. He held that the process of human evolution from hunter-gatherer to settled agriculture was among the most important factors that led to the creation of private property and the class system. Saadeh highlighted the role that the class system played in the flourishing of trade and commerce and the creation of wealth, ascribing it to be a characteristic of the Semitic peoples, namely the coastal Phoenicians. He also stressed the link between the economic modes of production and the establishment of cultural norms and values, a view he shared with Karl Marx.

However, Saadeh believed that while the economic modes of production can create culture, culture acquires a life of its own with time and eventually becomes embedded and perpetuated in its people, who come to recognize themselves as a living organism. Hence comes the importance of the state in serving the interest of the nation, and of national democracy as the legitimate source of political legislation. The party espouses the idea that the fundamental basis of nation is the territory or geographical region, not the ethnical bond. The natural environment and geographical specifications of a certain land is what eventually allows, or disallows, its transition from a socio-economic phase to another.

These natural geographical factors hence create the societal framework in which man establishes his existence, beliefs, habits, and value systems. Saadeh's critique of ethnic nationalisms led him to hence develop a framework of geographical nationalism, the idea of the "natural homeland". When he applied this model to the case of the Fertile Crescent, the conclusion he reached was straightforward: the natural geographical factors of the basin lying east of the Mediterranean is what has allowed it to become the cradle of civilizations, what has driven throughout the course of human history movements seeking to unify it, what has allowed it to establish, through ethnic, religious and cultural assimilation and mixing, a high culture and civilization, and what has made it the prize coveted by all imperialist powers. Saadeh advocated for all ethnoreligious groups to consider themselves as descendants of the pre-Christian era empires of Babylon and Assyria, of the Hittites and the kings of Aram, then of the Islamic empires, all the way up until the present. The SSNP claimed that the Greater Syria is the natural home of the Syrian people with clearly defined geographic boundaries, yet that its people are suffering from what Saadeh described as a "woe" (al-wail) owing to an identity crisis due to Ottoman occupation, colonialism, and sectarianism. Saadeh claimed that the renaissance of the Syrian nation is inevitably linked to the purge of these "decadent" forces through the reinforcing of national solidarity, resistance against colonialism, and adoption of secularism.

In Saadeh's vision of "harmony" among the country's ethnic and religious communities through a return to a so-called Syrian "racial unity" which was itself in fact a mixture of races, neither Islam nor pan-Arabism was important, and therefore religion wasn't either. Saadeh's concept of the nation was shaped mainly by historical concrete interactions amongst people over the centuries in a given geography, rather than being based on ethnic origins, race, language or religion.  This led him also to conclude that the Arabs could not form one nation, but many nations could be called Arab.

Syrian people 
The SSNP's Greater Syria ideal posed a problem for all of the existing nationalist movements because of its clear departure from Arab nationalist and Islamic undertones, and its inextricable link with what the party leader defined as "the Syrian people", Greater Syria being its natural homeland. The notion of a Syrian people is the cornerstone of the SSNP, and is defined according to the Party as the people inhabiting the Fertile Crescent, whose culture and socio-economic conditions have been a direct consequence of its own interaction with the natural environment.

The Syrian people, according to the Party's founder, is a cultural and socio-economic body of people hailing from a very heterogeneous background, but whose social mixing and assimilation over time within the Levantine basin has allowed for the emergence of a high settled civilization and for the extension of this people over the entirety of Natural Syria. In a clear departure from ethnic, racial and religious understandings of a nation, the Syrian people is a "mixture of races generated by migrations and intermarriages", its social life and cohesion having been shaped and determined by the environment and geography in which it developed. Hence the SSNP rejects racial notions of nationalism, Saadeh himself having ridiculed European racial doctrines in the opening chapters of the Genesis of Nations.

Romantic nationalism 
The attitude of the party and its founder towards minority separatism and movements calling for ethnically-separate homelands was one of outright hostility. Saadeh was also hostile to all religiously-motivated political movements, or movements that did not call for the separation between Church (or Mosque) and State. Thus he called Wahhabism and Islamism a "return to the desert", a "dry ideology of Arabian tribes" that had no commonalities with the high civilization of the Fertile Crescent. The incoming Jewish migrants to Southern Syria (Palestine) and the Jewish communities were criticized for their "foreign and racial loyalties", their unwillingness to assimilate, and their active willingness to create an ethnically Jewish state in Palestine, with Saadeh deeming the Jews as the community unable and unwilling to assimilate, and having criticized the notion that Jewishness can be a cornerstone for a nation-state. For the SSNP, the Jews do not constitute a nation as they are a heterogeneous mixture of peoples in a similar sense that Muslims and Christians do not constitute a nation. Similarly, the Kurds were attacked for their communitarianism and their disposition to establish a Kurdish state in the north. In what relates to the Arab–Israeli conflict, the party has since its establishment adopted a hard-lined anti-Zionist stance, while retaining its belief that a secular and democratic state in Palestine is the only proper solution to the conflict.
The societal cohesion of the Syrian people and its ability to properly assimilate newcomers, minorities, and migrations, is essential to its survival to its progress, and any movement that seeks to assert ethnic, religious, or racial separatism within the Syrian homeland is one that ought to be met with outright hostility. The answer to these threats, according to the Party, lay in the rebirth of the Syrian people, the Renaissance.

The Renaissance 
The Syrian people, as outlined above, is, according to Saadeh, among the first people to have historically moved from the tribal phase into the settled agricultural phase and towards the establishment of private property and social classes. This first transition allowed the Syrian people to prosper exponentially and to excel in most of the crafts of the ancient world. Saadeh and the party espoused the belief that a new transition has to take place, a transition to the modern age, which ought to have two prerequisites: the secular unity of the Syrian people and its renaissance. The unity of the Syrian people firstly implies debarring the clergy from interfering in state affairs, and enacting a full separation between Church-Mosque and State. This would inevitably allow the Syrian people to regain its unity and social cohesion.

The second task of the party is to work towards the Renaissance, which the party leader described as being a dynamic undertaking that would shatter what he described as the old regime. The Renaissance ideal, which Saadeh traces back to the ingenuity of the first Syrians – the Assyrians and the Phoenicians, among others, lies in the mastery of the Syrian people over the sciences and the crafts, which he eulogizes in The Genesis of Nations while attacking what he deemed as the antiquated notions of religious fatalism. In order to regain its mastery over the crafts and over its own destiny, Saadeh underlines the need for intellectualism, education, and the pursuit of knowledge as cornerstones of the future Syrian society, a notion he summarizes in his famous quote, "Society is knowledge, and knowledge is power".

Social nationalism 
While the Renaissance is underlined as a romanticized notion of spiritual, intellectual, and patriotic elevation, the SSNP elaborated a simple yet straightforward doctrine pertaining to how the Syrian People ought to organize itself once the Renaissance has begun, albeit the fact that Saadeh had not developed the idea completely. The social-nationalist model elaborated by Saadeh is reflected in the "Communiqué of the First Social Nationalist Revolution of 1949".

The first of these principles is the abolition of feudalism and of the rule of the traditional notables and landowners, which the Party deems responsible for the "desolate state of things to which the country had gotten to", including maintaining educational levels at an all-time low and being instrumental in the loss of Palestine. The second principle is "opposing capitalist tyranny". Despite its belief in the necessity of private property, the SSNP declared defending workers' rights and establishing a framework that guarantees these rights as an inalienable right. This is coupled with the need to establish mandatory education, universal healthcare, the nationalization of vital areas of the economy such as the production of raw materials, and a strong centralized state that is able to give economic directions. The third principle stated is combating communism. This remains a topic of debate, however, as the strongly pronounced nationalistic features of SSNP ideology would permit scholars to interpret social nationalism as a distinctive breed of National Syndicalism.

Liberation war 
Perhaps one of the most striking features of the Party throughout its history is the zealous and the almost mystical devotion of its members to the notion of liberation war. Most Party members have historically conducted military, guerrilla, and assassination operations. Saadeh himself had a very revolutionary view of life and death, whereas the Renaissance and the "New Generation" would not see the light of day without sacrifice: "we love life because we love freedom, and we love death when death is a path to life" is among the few quotes of Saadeh which the SSNP reveres.

Since its foundation in 1932, the SSNP adopted direct action and violence against those it deemed as the enemies of the Syrian People, to which it referred to as the "forces of darkness", while the founder referred to the Party as the "Sons of Life" (Abna` al-Hayat): Colonialism and particularly French colonialism in Syria and Lebanon, the feudal landowning and notable class, politicians it deemed to be traitors or corrupt, Zionist settlement of Palestine, Christian separatism in Lebanon, Islamic fundamentalism in Syria, a list to which could be added the communists, although this last addition would change in the course of the years as both would join ranks in the LNRF. 

In 1949, it declared the "First Renaissance Revolution" against the Lebanese government, an armed confrontation with the Lebanese and Syrian security forces that ended in a disaster and the execution of Antun Saadeh by the Lebanese authorities on 8 July. Not too long later, party members assassinated the Lebanese Prime Minister Riad al-Solh who was instrumental in Saadeh's death penalty. To avoid being caught, the assailants committed suicide. When one of the assailants survived and woke up in the hospital, he completed his suicide attempt by tearing up his wounds and falling from the bed. The assassination of the general prosecutor who judged Saadeh was also conducted by a Party cell, and Party members are believed to have been involved in the assassination of Husni al-Zaim, the Syrian dictator who captured Saadeh and handed him over to the Lebanese authorities.

In 1982, party member Habib al-Shartouni assassinated the Lebanese President Bachir Gemayel, seen as betraying the country in the Israeli invasion of Lebanon in 1982. The party also undertook many operations against Israeli presence in Lebanon, including a military operation in broad daylight against Israeli officers stationed in Beirut, which triggered the beginning of the generalized armed struggle for Lebanese liberation. Party member Sana'a Mehaidli, known as the first female suicide bomber, detonated herself in her car along with an Israeli convoy in south Lebanon. The party joined arms with the Communists, the PLO, the Arab nationalists, and other groups to fight against the Israeli invasion – see Lebanese National Movement/Lebanese National Resistance Front.

Today, the party's military wing fights alongside the Syrian Arab Army against the Free Syrian Army and ISIS in the Syrian Civil War. Journalist Terry Glavin write in 2015 that it "lavishly indulges a habit of suicide-bombing and assassination" and runs "death squads on behalf of its patron... Bashar Al-Assad, mostly in the vicinity of Homs and the suburbs of Damascus".

Secularism
The SSNP's ideology was an entirely secular form of nationalism; indeed, it posited the complete separation of religion and politics as one of the two fundamental conditions for real national unity, alongside economic and social reform.

Party form
The SSNP was organised with a hierarchical structure and a powerful leader.

Iconography and symbolism

Emblem and flag
The party's emblem is the whirlwind (in Arabic Zawba'a, زوبعة). It was designed by the SSNP students at the American University of Beirut while the party was still clandestine and before the French authorities had uncovered it in 1936. Saadeh stated the whirlwind was found engraved on ancient Syrian artifacts, and it is known from for example Sumerian art. The SSNP emblem has been said to be a combination of the Islamic crescent and the Christian cross. The party flag features a red hurricane, called the Zawba'a, within a white disc on a black background. Each arm symbolizes one of the four virtues of the party's mission: freedom, duty, discipline and power. According to SSNP lore, the black color symbolizes the Dark Ages of Ottoman rule, colonialism, sectarian division, national division, and backwardness. The Zawba'a allegedly represents the blood of the SSNP martyrs bound together as Muslims and Christians through freedom, duty, discipline and power as a hurricane to purge the Dark Ages and spark their nation's rejuvenation and renaissance. Critics and many scholars claim that the symbol was modeled after the Nazi swastika a claim that the party denies.

Criticism

Ideological criticism
Arab nationalist thinker Sati' al-Husri considered that Saadeh "misrepresented" Arab nationalism, incorrectly associating it with a Bedouin image of the Arab and with Muslim sectarianism. Palestinian historian Maher Charif sees Saadeh's theory as a response to the religious diversity of Syria, and points to his later extension of his vision of the Syrian nation to include Iraq, a country also noted for its religious diversity, as further evidence for this. The party also accepted that due to "religious and political considerations", the separate existence of Lebanon was necessary for the time being.

From 1945 onward, the party adopted a more nuanced stance regarding Arab nationalism, seeing Syrian unity as a potential first step towards an Arab union led by Syria.

Scholarly criticism
Lebanese historian Kamal Salibi gives a somewhat contrasting interpretation, pointing to the position of the Greek Orthodox community as a large minority in both Syria and Lebanon for whom "the concept of pan-Syrianism was more meaningful than the concept of Arabism" while at the same time they resented Maronite dominance in Lebanon. According to Salibi,

 Saadeh found a ready following among his co-religionists. His idea of secular pan-Syrianism also proved attractive to many Druzes and Shiites; to Christians other than the Greek Orthodox, including some Maronites who were disaffected by both Lebanism and Arabism; and also to many Sunnite Muslims who set a high value on secularism, and who felt that they had far more in common with their fellow Syrians of whatever religion or denomination than with fellow Sunnite or Muslim Arabs elsewhere. Here again, an idea of nationalism had emerged which had sufficient credit to make it valid. In the Lebanese context, however, it became ready cover for something more archaic, which was essentially Greek Orthodox particularism.

Prof. Salibi remarks on the beginnings of Saadeh's party in the 1930s: "[A]mong its first members were students and young graduates of the American University of Beirut." This early party was "mainly Greek Orthodox and Protestants with some Shi'ites and Druzes... ." In Lebanon as a whole the party was not popular. "Christians were generally opposed to their Syrian unionism, while Moslems were suspicious of their reservations with regard to pan-Arabism. The Lebanese authorities were able to suppress them without difficulty."

See also
Antoun Saadeh
1958 Lebanon crisis
Lebanese Civil War
Lebanese National Movement
Mountain War (Lebanon)
Lebanese Communist Party
Anti-Zionism
Secularism in Lebanon
Syrian Social Nationalist Party – Intifada Wing

Notes

References

Citations

Sources

 Charif, Maher, Rihanat al-nahda fi'l-fikr al-'arabi, Damascus, Dar al-Mada, 2000
 Hourani, Albert, La Pensée Arabe et l'Occident (French translation of Arab Thought in the Liberal Age)
 Irwin, Robert, "An Arab Surrealist". The Nation, 3 January 2005, 23–24, 37–38.
 Salibi, K. S., The Modern History of Lebanon (New York: Praeger 1965)
 Salibi, Kamal, A House of Many Mansions: The History of Lebanon Reconsidered, University of California, Berkeley, 1988; reprint: London, I.B. Tauris, 1998 
 Seale, Patrick, Asad: the Struggle for the Middle East, Berkeley, University of California Press, 1988

External links
SSNP website 
SSNP School 
Tahawolat Magazine Articles about society and culture
Attacks attributed to the SSNP

 
Articles containing video clips
Political parties in Syria
Syncretic political movements
Political parties established in 1932
Axis of Resistance